Siobhan Hunter (born 10 April 1994) is a Scottish footballer who currently plays as a defender for Hibernian in the Scottish Women's Premier League.

Hunter first signed with Hibernian youth as a 9-year old in March 2004.

Hunter, returning from a broken collar bone, came on as a substitute in the 2018 SWPL Cup Final, in which Hibs beat Celtic 9–0 at Falkirk Stadium.

2017 Scottish Cup Final
In the 2017 Scottish Cup final against Glasgow City, Hunter scored the third goal with a 40-yard free kick, in a 3–0 win. The goal was nominated for, and subsequently won, the Women's Soccer United goal of the month.

International career
Hunter has been capped for the Scotland Under 15, Under 17, Under 19 and Women's teams.

Hunter appeared over 30 times before being capped at full level.

Hunter made her debut for the Scotland Women's team in a 3–2 friendly win over Iceland in Reykjavik, in June 2013. Hunter was capped twice in 2013.

Honours

Hibernian
 Scottish Women's Cup (3): 2010, 2016, 2017
 Scottish Women's Premier League Cup (3): 2011, 2016, 2017, 2018

References

External links
 

1994 births
Living people
Hibernian W.F.C. players
Scottish women's footballers
Scottish Women's Premier League players
Women's association football defenders
Scotland women's international footballers